James Bonar WS (1801–1867) was a Scottish lawyer and philanthropist who was an important figure in the Disruption of 1843 serving as Secretary to the Free Church of Scotland and a major figure in Edinburgh Society. He was also involved with promoting the welfare and education of the deaf in Scotland and Edinburgh in particular.

Although his civic actions were perhaps initiated by necessity he improved Edinburgh both functionally and visually and is probably the primary saviour of Trinity College Kirk.

Life

Bonar was born in Edinburgh on 20 June 1801.
He was descended from the Bonars of Kilgraston with multiple ministers in his lineage. He was the eldest son of James Bonar the Solicitor of the Excise for Scotland. His mother was Marjory Pyott Maitland. He was a brother of Horatius Bonar and Andrew Bonar. They lived at Paterson's Court in the Broughton district of Edinburgh. Paterson's Court lay next to Broughton Market at the west end of what is now Barony Street.

He trained as a lawyer under his uncle Charles Tawse who had married his aunt Christiana Bonar. This training was at 32 Gayfield Square in Edinburgh. He did further training under James Gibson Craig before returning to Tawse as a junior partner creating Tawse & Bonar WS.

In 1821 he joined the Homiletical Society. He was also secretary of The Diagnostic Society of Edinburgh. This was then meeting under the Tabernacle Church in Greenside, Edinburgh.

In 1828 he was on the committee involved in the creation of the Royal Institute for the Deaf and Dumb on Henderson Row (later amalgamated with Donaldson's Hospital).

In 1830 he became an elder in Lady Glenorchy's Church in central Edinburgh, which was his whole family's place of worship. The minister was Rev Thomas Snell Jones. This stood close to Trinity College Chapel until it was replaced by what ia now Waverley Station. Bonar also started adopting several other religious and philanthropic roles including: The Edinburgh City Mission (trying to bring the poor back to the church), the Edinburgh Orphan Hospital (located next to Lady Glenorchy's Chapel), the Society for Propagating Christian Knowledge in the Highlands and Islands, Edinburgh and Leith's Seaman's Friend Society. The latter he was founder and director in 1820, aged only 19.

In the 1830s he was on the committee to relocate the town orphanage from its central location to the Dean Orphanage in the west of the city. This was necessitated both by the antiquity of the structure and the proposed railway line/station on the site which was mooted from 1830 and fixed as an idea by an Act of Parliament in 1836. In liaison was the patron of the church, Lady Glenorchy, she agreed to combine her own monies with compensation from the railway company to build a grand new orphanage at the Dean. In 1833 the Lord Provost John Learmonth was also brought into the scheme, and he gifted a huge tract of land (in his personal ownership) for the scheme. Bonar may have also put in considerable funds, either as a bridge until the railway money materialised, or as a permanent gift.

From 1834 Tawse & Bonar operated from 15 York Place where James lived with his widowed mother.

In 1838 he organised and largely paid for St Ninian's Church in Laith, an independent church for mariners, which became a Free Church in 1843. This also included a pair of schools for boys and girls attached on its west side.

From 1833 to 1843 he was involved in the legal arguments of the "Ten Year's Conflict" within the Church of Scotland. At the creation of the Free Church of Scotland he provided legal support to the Free Church in several property arguments as to who owned the church buildings, including Lady Glenorchy's Church.

From 1843 when he joined the Free Church of Scotland he was on the Senatus of New College, Edinburgh, serving as Secretary to the Church and involved in the finances and organisation of the church administration. He organised the building of Lady Glenorchy's Free Church on Greenside Place, a huge church with multiple galleries, unusually accessed at upper level due to the steeply sloping Greenside Place - a site immediately south of the Tabernacle Church. In this move the minister of the pre-existing Lady Glenorchy's Church Rev George Ramsay Davidson, left the established church and became minister of this new Free Church at Greenside.

He was involved in the legalities of the creation of Waverley Station especially in relationship of Lady Glenorchy's Chapel, Trinity College Chapel, the old Deaf and Dumb School and the old city orphanage. This involved the creation of the new city orphanage at Dean, a truly impressive structure. In this capacity he was also on the committee which founded Donaldson's Hospital for the Deaf (1851). It is noteworthy that James Donaldson (1751-1830), the benefactor of the school, was a close neighbour of the Bonars, living at Broughton Hall.

The British Government appointed him overseer to the Bible Printing Board for Scotland, which authorised the numerous versions as correct translations and agreed any notes and postscripts.

In 1859 he was happy to be at the re-opening of Lady Glenorchy's Church, the element still linked to the established Church of Scotland which relocated to Richmond Place in the south of the city. He may have been involved in the legalities of this move despite his transfer to the Free Church. It is unclear if the railway company also paid for this second church.

In 1860 he was living alone at 15 York Place, Edinburgh, a ground floor and basement duplex with a Georgian tenement. He lived here for the rest of his life but also had a country residence in Juniper Green.

He died on 11 July 1867 in Juniper Green in the south-west outskirts of Edinburgh. He is buried with his parents and other members of his family in Canongate Kirkyard. on the Royal Mile. The grave lies in the north-west corner of the eastern extension.

The rebuilding of Trinity College Chapel (now on Chalmers Close) did not begin until 1872 but it seems that Bonar probably set out the legal agreement requiring its dismantling, storage and reconstruction. Without Bonar this gem would have been lost.

Trivia

The frontage of Lady Glenorchy's Free Church is now incorporated into the hotel element of the Omni Centre in Edinburgh. The bulk of the building was demolished in 1985 and the frontage stood as a scaffolded structure for two decades before amalgamation with the new building. Lady Glenorchy's Church (C of S) was sold by the church in the late 2oth century and is now a music venue.

Paterson's Court was demolished in 1938 to allow redevelopment as Council housing by the city architect, Ebenezer James MacRae.

Family

James was unmarried and had no children.

His older sister Margaret Bonar (1796-1869) married his business colleague Andrew Tawse WS (1788-1851).

References

Citations

Sources

1801 births
1867 deaths
Philanthropists from Edinburgh
Lawyers from Edinburgh
Scottish philanthropists
Free Church of Scotland people